Don't Be a Sucker is a short film produced by the United States Department of War released in 1943, and adapted as a slightly shorter version in 1947. It has anti-racist and anti-fascist themes, and was made to educate viewers about prejudice and discrimination. The film was also made to make the case for the desegregation of the United States armed forces. It is held for preservation by the U.S. National Archives.

Plot
An American Freemason who has been listening to a racist and bigoted rabble-rouser, who is preaching hate speech against ethnic and religious minorities and immigrants, is warned off by a naturalized Hungarian immigrant, possibly a Holocaust survivor or escapee, who explains to him how such rhetoric and demagoguery allowed the Nazis to rise to power in Weimar Germany, and warns Americans not to fall for similar demagoguery propagated by American racists and bigots.

In popular culture
In August 2017, the short film went viral on the internet in the aftermath of the Unite the Right rally in Charlottesville, Virginia, and various copies have been uploaded to video-sharing sites since then.

Cast
 Paul Lukas as the Hungarian Refugee
 Richard Lane as the Soapbox Orator 
 Felix Bressart as the Anti-Nazi Teacher
 Bob Bailey as Mike
 Robert Adler as a Listener
 Chick Chandler as a Con artist
 George Chandler as Sucker
 Kurt Kreuger as Hans
 Frank O'Connor as a Listener

Gallery

See also
 The House I Live In
 Suppression of Freemasonry § Nazi Germany and occupied Europe

References

Other sources
  (PDF)

External links
 
 Don't Be a Sucker download on the Internet Archive
 Don't Be a Sucker download by Prelinger Archives on the Internet Archive
 

1943 short films
1943 films
1947 films
Anti-fascist propaganda films
American social guidance and drug education films
United States Department of War
American World War II propaganda shorts
Germany–United States relations
Articles containing video clips
American black-and-white films
American war films
1940s war films
Anti-racism in the United States
1940s American films